Glibornuride (INN) is an anti-diabetic drug from the group of sulfonylureas. It is manufactured by MEDA Pharma and sold in Switzerland under the brand name Glutril.

Synthesis 

Gliburnide is an endo-endo derivative made from camphor-3-carboxamide by borohydride reduction (exo approach), followed by Hofmann rearrangement to carbamate, followed by displacement with sodium tosylamide.

References 

Potassium channel blockers
Secondary alcohols
1-(Benzenesulfonyl)-3-cyclohexylureas
p-Tosyl compounds